In Tibetan cuisine, papza mogu is a dough shaped into balls with melted butter, brown sugar, and dry curd cheese.  It gives a sweet and sour taste and is red in color.

See also
 List of Tibetan dishes

References

Tibetan cuisine